Petralinci is a village in the municipality of Bosilovo, North Macedonia.

Demographics
According to the 2002 census, the village had a total of 605 inhabitants. Ethnic groups in the village include:

Macedonians 602
Others 3

References

See also
 Bosilovo Municipality
 Bosilovo
 Strumica

Villages in Bosilovo Municipality